"Angel in Blue Jeans" is a song recorded by American rock band Train for their seventh studio album Bulletproof Picasso. The song was written by Pat Monahan, Amund Bjørklund, and Espen Lind, and was produced by the latter two as well as Butch Walker. It was released on June 9, 2014 as the lead single from the album.

Music video
The music video premiered on July 14, 2014 via the band's YouTube channel, and was officially released through their VEVO account on July 15, 2014. Directed by SCRANTON and Mel Soria, the video stars New Girl actress Hannah Simone as the titular angel, Danny Trejo as a heroic derivative of his Robert Rodriguez character Machete, and Train frontman Pat Monahan as a villainous sheriff. The video is influenced by the Spaghetti Western film genre, and features Trejo lip-synching to the lyrics.

Charts

Weekly charts

Year-end charts

Certifications

References

2014 singles
2014 songs
Train (band) songs
Columbia Records singles
Song recordings produced by Butch Walker
Rock ballads
Songs written by Amund Bjørklund
Songs written by Espen Lind